Michel Waldschmidt (born June 17, 1946 at Nancy, France) is a French mathematician, specializing in number theory, especially transcendental numbers.

Biography 
Waldschmidt was educated at Lycée Henri Poincaré and the University of Nancy until 1968. In 1972 he defended his thesis, titled Indépendance algébrique de nombres transcendants (Algebraic independence of transcendental numbers) and directed by Jean Fresnel, the University of Bordeaux, where he was research associate of CNRS in 1971–2. He was then a lecturer at Paris-Sud 11 University in 1972–3, then a lecturer at the University of Paris VI (Pierre et Marie Curie), where he is Professor since 1973. Waldschmidt was also a visiting professor at places  including the École normale supérieure.

Today, Michel Waldschmidt is an expert in the theory of transcendental numbers and diophantine approximations.

He was awarded the Albert Châtelet Prize in 1974, the CNRS Silver Medal in 1978, the Marquet Prize of Academy of Sciences in 1980 and the Special Award of the Hardy–Ramanujan Society  in 1986.

From 2001 to 2004 he was president of the Mathematical Society of France. He is a member of several mathematical societies, including the EMS, the AMS and Ramanujan Mathematical Society.

He is interested in exchange programs for researchers and students and was, from 2005 to 2009, Vice President CIMPA (International Centre for Pure and Applied Mathematics), formed in Nice for promote international cooperation. He participated in the coordination of cooperation in mathematics of France with many countries, including India and Middle East.

In 2021 he was awarded the Bertrand Russell Prize by the American Mathematical Society.

Selected publications
Diophantine approximation on linear algebraic groups. Springer, 2000 
Nombres transcendants, Lecture Notes in Mathematics, vol. 402, 1974, Springer 
Nombres transcendants et groupes algébriques, Astérisque, vol. 69/70, 1979, 2e tirage 1987
Transcendence Methods, Queens Papers in Pure and Applied Mathematics, 1979
With J.-M. Luck, P. Moussa, C. Itzykson  (eds.), From Number Theory to Physics, 1995

References

External links 
 
 Homepage to Jussieu
 
  on frenchsciencetoday.org
 search on author Michel Waldschmidt from Google Scholar

French mathematicians
1946 births
Living people
Number theorists
Academic staff of the University of Paris
Nancy-Université alumni